is a Japanese picture book series by Tatsuya Miyanishi, published by Poplar. The series has spawned animated film and anime adaptations. The fourth film My Tyrano II: Easter, Garden was planned to release in 2024 but was Delayed to 2025

Plot (based on the film)
In the Late Cretaceous Period, a female Maiasaura finds an egg and decides that the baby in the egg needs to be taken care of, so she adopts it as her own. She takes it to her nest near Egg Mountain, a volcano with a giant egg shaped rock. One fateful day, a marauding pack of Troodon attacks the nesting grounds, snatching and eating the Maiasaura eggs. The outcome of the attack resulted in the mother losing all but two of her eggs (one of which is the egg she saved). As the eggs hatched, one was born a male Maiasaura, whom the mother named Light, and from the egg she found, the baby is revealed to be a Tyrannosaurus, named Heart. The herd leader was about to kill Heart in order to prevent him from eating anyone when he gets older, but the mother Maiasaura stops him, arguing that he is a newborn and harmless. The leader then gives her the chance of leaving him in the wild where he belongs, and she was about to do so. However, she changes her mind out of guilt of abandoning Heart and leaving him alone, so she decides to move from the herd and raise her children by herself. Years later, Light and Heart now live in the forest with their mother, where they would be safe from predators and free from the herd. But Heart is unaware of his carnivorous nature and can only eat berries. While they were playing, Heart and Light fell from a cliff and a swamp, where they meet a sloth mother singing a song about tyrannosaurs and describing their appearances. The sloth sees Heart and retreats in fear, while Light jokes about the appearance of Heart, saying that he looks like the description in the song. His words makes Heart sad and he starts crying. When their mother finds them, she grounds Light about what he says and he apologizes. However, despite the fact that Heart asks their mother to not blame Light, some questions start to mess up his mind.

As Heart is unable to live by eating plants and can't sustain himself of berries, he travels outside the forest and into the plains to look for some food that he could eat; unfortunately, he watches a Triceratops fighting a pack of Tyrannosaurus, one of which is impaled by one of its horns and killed. Suddenly from the mist enters Baku, a particularly large Tyrannosaurus with a scar over his right eye, who slams the Triceratops to the ground, killing it. After watching the pack eat the corpse, Heart panics and tries to retreat quietly to avoid being eaten as well, not knowing he was one of them. However, one of the Tyrannosaurus named Gonza notices his presence and the fact that he smells like a herbivore. Baku asks him about his family, and Heart fearfully answered that he had a brother and a mother, not telling that they are Maiasaura. Then Baku explains the lifestyle of a predator, which makes Heart flee in panic, without noticing that Gonza was following him. After rejoining with Light, Heart tells in disdain his experience with the Tyrannosaurus, but Gonza arrives and threatens to eat Light. In panic Light yells to Heart to save himself, causing Gonza to wonder why a Maiasaura would take care of a Tyrannosaurus. Light explains that Heart is his brother, but then Gonza reveals Heart's real species, which Heart denies and attacks Gonza. He bites and rips off his tail, leaving Gonza to flee in pain, feeling betrayed. Unfortunately, upon eating the tail, Heart realizes that Gonza was telling the truth, and, upon tackling Light, that he couldn't control his predatory instincts, he decides to run away to avoid killing and eating his family.

Years later, Heart is now a fully grown dinosaur with enhanced hunting and martial arts skills, what he demonstrates by beating a whole herd of Titanosaurus, and having a step forward from Gonza's pack. Meanwhile, Light is allowed to return to the herd as Heart doesn't live with them anymore. One day Heart discovers an egg which houses an Ankylosaurus. When the baby hatches, Heart tells him that he is "Umasou" (the Japanese word for delicious), and he prepares to devour him, until the baby jumps and cuddles Heart, believing that Heart was his father and that Umasou was his name, much to Heart's surprise and confusion. He decides to raise him; initially to wait until he fattens enough for him to eat, but he begins to give up this scheme after a bad dream about his old family. Umasou acts very loving toward Heart, but Heart remains emotionally distant to Umasou as he doesn't know exactly how to deal with him. Later Heart goes to hunt a Parasaurolophus, leaving Umasou waiting for him in the grass. A nearby Chilantaisaurus notices him and is about to eat him, but Heart arrives and quickly sends it flying away with a kick. Umasou cheers Heart for saving him, and Heart angrily tells him that the Chilantaisaurus could have eaten him and to stay alert for predators. The next day, Umasou wants to gather berries to eat with his father, while Heart frantically searches for Umasou. He gives up the search and loses hope, but then Umasou returns with the berries like nothing happened. Enraged, Heart yells at Umasou to go away, which makes Umasou cry and tell why he left. Heart notices the berries and apologizes for yelling at him before starting to eat to make him fell better, even starting to be moved. Umasou mentions that he got the berries from an elderly Tyrannosaurus who has grown too old to eat solid food and eats the berries, who will introduce himself as Bekon. The two go to meet him and he explains a part of Baku's story: One day, a massive pack of Giganotosaurus arrived from the south and goes on a rampage, killing everything in their path, forcing Baku to fight them by himself. The battle resulted in him losing an eye and receiving his scar, but he succeeded in defeating the Giganotosaurus and is now the king of the plains. After Bekon ask Heart how he will deal with the fact that Umasou will one day be separated from him due to their respective condition, Heart decides to train Umasou to protect himself from predators.

Even after all the good time he spent with Umasou, Heart still didn't really accept him as his son as he was worried he might find out the truth, so he tricks him into having a race where, if Umasou wins, Heart would stay with him forever, and lets him run away from Heart. But Umasou enters the outlands where encounters Gonza's pack, who nearly kills him. Realizing Umasou was in danger, Heart went to the rescue and saw Gonza about to eat Umasou. Driven to a rage, Heart attacks Gonza and kept Umasou safe in his mouth, before defeating the gang with his bare martial arts skills. Then Baku appears, witnessing what Heart did, and decides to banish Heart as a punishment for beating others of his kind. Once Heart got away from the plains, he is relieved and glad to see that Umasou, even though he's weakened, is still alive and safe. But Umasou also noticed that he didn't catch him in time, so Heart finally accepts him as his son and promises to live together, and they leave the plains to find their new home. While this time, Baku went to the meeting with Bekon and the old dinosaur starts to discuss about the fact that Heart looks like Baku at his age. As Bekon begins to talk about Baku's lost egg, Baku put a end to the conversation by saying that this matter belongs to the past.

Months later, Heart and Umasou (who had grown slightly bigger) have moved to a beach. But Heart falls from a cliff and into the ocean, where he is saved by a female Elasmosaurus called Pero Pero. Pero Pero didn't know at first that Heart was a carnivore, until the two met and got attacked by a Tylosaurus, which Heart kills by ripping off one of its flippers. Yet, Heart promised to never hurt Pero Pero, and she won't be afraid of him. After Pero Pero realizes that Egg Mountain is having high volcanic activity and tells it to Heart, he and Umasou go to save their family. On the way, as they cross Baku's territory again, their first obstacle is Gonza, who wants to get revenge for everything that Heart did to him, and he wouldn't let them pass until he's dead. The two have a very short fight, in which Heart wins by ripping a chunk off of Gonza's neck. As he lays dying, Gonza ridicules the fact that Umasou is Heart's son, telling Umasou that Heart is not his father. Umasou says that he knew this, but still considers Heart his dad, who is suddenly choked up and moved to hear that. Knowing this, Gonza try to apologizes (and maybe forgives Heart), but finally succumb to his wound. When Heart reaches Light's herd, his brother informs him that their mom doesn't live with the herd all the time and that she is probably in their former home in the forest. He didn't look for her because of his job in the herd as guardian. However, the herd is too afraid of the volcano to move. Out of his disappointment, Heart starts to scare away all the Maiasaura to move to safety. After clearing the second obstacle, Heart rushes to encounter his mother, whom at last feels relieved and warm-hearted upon finding her lost son.

After crying and apologizing to her for leaving so suddenly when he was young, Heart introduces Umasou, and meets his new siblings, a girl and two male twins. After the warm reunion, all the family, including Light who decided to join them, head away from the mountain, whose eruption was strong enough to blast the egg rock from the volcano. They almost escape from the eruption, but Baku appears from the volcanic dust and threatens to kill Heart since he disobeyed his order of exile. In order to protect his family, Heart accepts a duel with Baku, in which Baku uses normal Tyrannosaur attacks and movements and Heart displays quick martial arts kicks. In the midst of the battle, Heart bites Baku's neck, which proves to be a great mistake when Baku grabs Heart, leaps, and smashes him with all his weight to crush him, almost killing him. Heart's mother pleads to spare him, revealing that she is his adoptive mother. This makes Baku wonder what would she do if Heart was starving for not eating meat, to which she responds that she would let him eat her, which Baku considers nonsense. He explains that a carnivore has to eat meat every day in order to survive. At the same time, he accepts that Heart wouldn't have survived without her help, so he agrees to spare Heart and the others. As Baku lies down to recover from his wounds from the battle, he tells Heart to be strong and good with a certain emotion (implying that Baku is probably Heart's father).

In the aftermath, Heart's Mom asked him if he would live with them when they reached their new home, but he refuses, telling that it would be better for everyone to stay with their own species. She agrees, guessing Heart would have wanted that, but he also denies, saying that he enjoyed being her son. The family cuddles and wave goodbye for the last time before Heart and Umasou go on their way again. During the end credits, the Maiasaura herd move on to a new home. Baku returns to the plains and Bekon welcomes him back. The movie ends with Heart and Umasou watching the egg rock of Egg Mountain fly away to outer space.

Cast (based on the film)
Tomoyo Harada as Mother
Kato Seishiro as Umasou
Kappei Yamaguchi as Heart
Rikako Aikawa as Heart (Young)
Fumiko Orikasa as Light (Young)
Takuya Kirimoto as Gonza
Tokuyoshi Kawashima as Light
Maria Kawamura as Pero Pero
Minoru Yada as Beckon
Tetsuya Bessho as Baku

Animated adaptation
Miyanishi Tatsuya Gekijō: Omae Umasou da na, the anime series, aired on TV Tokyo beginning on October 4, 2010 to October 29, 2010. The film opened in Japan on October 16, 2010.

Dinosaurs and other prehistoric reptiles featured
 Achillobator (two individuals chased by Heart)
 Alamosaurus (cameo)
 Ankylosaurus (Umasou)
 Archelon (cameo)
 Avisaurus (background only)
Camarasaurus (skull only)
 Chilantaisaurus (the purple horned carnivore, species implied in the second episode of the animated series)
 Elasmosaurus (Pero Pero)
 Giganotosaurus (seen only in Baku's backstory, referred to as "gluttonous long-necks from the south")
 Maiasaura (Light, Heart and Light's mother, among others)
 Ornithocheirus (background only, one is seen in the beach scene dropping a red berry)
 Ornithomimus (background only)
 Parasaurolophus (background only, one is killed by Heart)
 Protoceratops (seen fleeing from Heart, one is killed and eaten)
 Pteranodon (background only)
 Spinosaurus  (Mesomeso)
 Titanosaurus (the sauropod herd Heart defeats)
 Triceratops (one battles Gonza's pack and is killed by Baku, others appear in the background)
 Troodon (the flock of maniraptorans that raid the Maiasaura nesting grounds)
 Tylosaurus (fights Heart and is killed)
 Tyrannosaurus (Heart, Baku, Gonza, Bekon, among others)
 Velociraptor (burnt corpse seen during eruption)
 prehistoric mammal (most likely Cimolestes)
 prehistoric sloth
 several neornithes
 corpse of a narrow-snouted theropod, possibly a Baryonyx

Reception
Freelance writer Riley Black said in a Smithsonian article that the film was one of the strangest and "most adorable" dinosaur films she has seen.

References

External links

 You Are Umasou film website 
 You Are Umasou - TV Tokyo 
 

Children's novels about animals
Dinosaurs in anime and manga
Discotek Media
Japanese books
Japanese children's novels
Japanese animated films
Animated films about dinosaurs